is a Japanese film producer and a critic, and also as known as , a music producer.

Biography 
Tatsuya Kimura was born in 1964 in Kyoto, Kyoto Prefecture, Japan. Debuted as a critic in his high school days. He graduated Waseda University in Tokyo in 1987.

In 1993, he joined in and wrote for Cahiers du cinéma Japon with Shinji Aoyama, Kiyoshi Kurosawa and Makoto Shinozaki. During 2003 - 2007, he nominated newcomers for Kido Award and found new scenarists, Ryō Wada, Tomonori Ozaki and Sachiko Tanaka (later, a writer for Kiyoshi Kurosawa's Tokyo Sonata). He worked for The 49th Asia Pacific Film Festival as a director in 2004. In December 2005, Jury for The 9th Scenario Award in Hakodate Port Illumination Film Festival 2005, with Yoichi Sai, George Iida and Hiroshi Aramata. In February 2006, he acted with his friends and artists like Ay-O, Genpei Akasegawa and Ryuichi Sakamoto in Museum of Contemporary Art, Tokyo for the first event in the world for Nam June Paik's death.

Selected filmography 
 The Hitman: Blood Smells Like Roses (ザ・ヒットマン 血はバラの匂い, 1991) as an assistant director
 J movie wars: Tsuki wa dotchi ni dete iru (月はどっちに出ている, 1993) - Japanese Professional Movie Award 1994
 Mechanical Violator Hakaider (人造人間ハカイダー, 1995)
 Blooming Again (死に花, 2004)
 Taitei no Ken (大帝の剣, 2007)
 God's Puzzle (神様のパズル, 2008)
 The Harimaya Bridge (The Harimaya Bridge はりまや橋, 2009)
 Boku to mama no kiiroi jitensha (ぼくとママの黄色い自転車, 2009)

References

External links 
 
 Tatsuya Kimura works - Bibliography (ja)
 Picture Yourself Sound School - Picture Yourself Sound School Official Weblog (ja)

Japanese film producers
Japanese record producers
Japanese DJs
Japanese screenwriters
Japanese music critics
Japanese film critics
Japanese art critics
1964 births
Living people
People from Kyoto
Waseda University alumni